Fulmor is a derelict railroad station in Upper Moreland Township, Pennsylvania, located near the intersection of Warminster Road and Mill Road. The station was originally built by the North East Pennsylvania Railroad. It was later taken over by SEPTA Regional Rail for the R2 Warminster Line, and the original building was replaced by a fiberglass shelter. SEPTA closed the station in 1996 as part of several service cuts; at the time it saw only 15 riders per day.

References

Former SEPTA Regional Rail stations
Former Reading Company stations
Railway stations closed in 1996
Former railway stations in Montgomery County, Pennsylvania